Nikitaras was the nom de guerre of Nikitas Stamatelopoulos (c. 17841849), a Greek revolutionary in the Greek War of Independence. Due to his fighting prowess, he was known as Turkofagos or Turkophagos, literally meaning the "Turk-Eater".

Biography

The date and place of Nikitaras' birth are disputed, but he is thought to have been born either in the village of Nedoussa (Νέδουσα) in the Peloponnesian province of Messenia or in Leontari in Arcadia circa 1784. He was a nephew of Theodoros Kolokotronis, the most important Greek military leader of the Revolution. Turkish authorities tried to capture him, as well as Kolokotronis, but he escaped and joined his uncle in the British-held Ionian Islands.

When the Greek war of Independence began, both returned to the mainland. He was with Kolokotronis, who commanded the Greek army at the Siege of Tripoli early in the war. When the commander and his men tried to escape the city, Nikitaras and his troops cut off the escape of the Turkish commander and his troops and slaughtered them. Nikitas achieved fame and his sobriquet "Turk-Eater" in the Battle of Dervenakia, where he is said to have used five swords: four broke from excessive use. During the civil war within the Revolution, he sided with his uncle against the faction around Alexander Mavrokordatos.

Nikitaras was a strong patriot, not corrupt like many of the leaders of the Revolution. When Ioannis Kolettis asked him to kill a rival, Odysseas Androutsos, in exchange for a government position, Nikitaras refused the offer and became angry with Kolettis. He also refused to take booty after battle, a normal practice of Balkan irregulars at the time. After the Revolution he and his family were living in poverty.

After the war, Nikitaras was jailed with his uncle Kolokotronis as strong opponents of the Bavarian Regency. He was also a strong campaigner for the rights of those who fought in the Revolution. Nikitaras was released from prison in 1841, but the period in jail broke his health and he died in 1849 in Piraeus.

He is especially famous for his words during the Third Siege of Missolonghi. When he arrived in the city with supplies, soldiers, who had not been paid in months, asked him if he had brought any money. Nikitaras, angry, flung down his sword, a weapon taken from a Turk he had killed, uttering the words: "I have only my sword, and that I gladly give for my country." Nikitaras is remembered in the poem by Nikos Gatsos, "The Knight and Death".

References

Citations

Bibliography
 

1780s births
1849 deaths
18th-century Greek people
19th-century Greek people
Greek people of the Greek War of Independence
Speakers of the Hellenic Parliament
Members of the Greek Senate
People from Arcadia, Peloponnese
People from Kalamata